The 2017 Pan American Surf Games, also referred to as PASA Games 2017 and officially named 2017 Pan American Claro Games for sponsorship reasons, was the thirteenth edition of the Pan American Surf Games the main competition organized by the Pan American Surf Association. It was held at Punta Rocas Beach in Punta Negra District, Lima, Peru from 4 to 9 December 2018.

The competition was originally scheduled to take place at Punta Roquitas Beach, located in Miraflores District, which had hosted the previous edition of the games. Eventually, it was moved to Punta Negra, 50 mins south of Miraflores.

220 athletes from 15 national teams competed in 8 surfing events; comprising Open (Shortboard), Longboard, SUP surf and SUP race each for men and women. It was the first time that the competing events had full gender equality, with the quotas for male and female competitors being the same in each one.

Defending champions Peru won the competition for the fourth time with a total of 13,901 points and 3 out of the 8 gold medals at stake. Brazil finished second with 12,223 points and 3 gold medal. Argentina (10,613 points and 1 gold medal) and Canada (9,999 points and 1 gold medal) were third and fourth respectively.

Schedule
The games were held over a 6-day period, from 4 to 9 December. The opening ceremony took place on 4 December, with the competitions starting on 5 December.

Participating nations
15 out of the 26 national associations affiliated to Pan American Surf Association entered the competition. Each nation was able to enter a maximun of 20 surfers (10 men and 10 women), with up to 4 surfers per gender in the Open events (shortboard) and up to 2 surfers per gender in each Longboard, SUP surf and SUP race events.

Medal table

Results

Men's events

Women's events

Final ranking per teams
The final ranking per teams was drawn up by adding each surfer's individual points earning in the events in which they competed. Surfers obtained points according to the final position they occupied in each event. In Open, Longboard and SUP surf events, the surfers eliminated before the final occupied a certain position, as follows:

In Open events
Eliminated in qualifying round 1: 3rd place in each heat, 33rd place (men) and 25th place (women); 4th place in each heat, 49th place (men) and 37th place (women).
Eliminated in qualifying round 2: 3rd place in each heat, 17th place (men) and 13th place (women); 4th place in each heat, 25th place (men) and 19th place (women).
Eliminated in qualifying round 3: 3rd place in each heat, 9th place (men) and 7th place (women); 4th place in each heat, 13th place (men) and 10th place (women).
Eliminated in qualifying round 4: 3rd place in each heat, 5th place (men and women); 4th place in each heat, 7th place (men).
In Longboard  and SUP surf events
Eliminated in qualifying round 1: 13th place (3rd place of each heat) and 19th place (4th place of each heat).
Eliminated in qualifying round 2: 7th place (3rd place of each heat) and 10th place (4th place of each heat).
Eliminated in qualifying round 3: 5th place (3rd place of each heat).

Non-initiators and non-finishers surfers received zero points. Points awarded according to the position were as follows:

The first place of the final ranking per teams was declared as the champion team of the 2017 Pan American Surf Games.

External links
2017 Pan American Surf Games at PASA website.
Final results summary

References

Pan American Surf Games